The Anti-Queens are a Canadian punk rock band.

Discography 
 Grow Up / Stay Young (2013)
 Start Running (2015)
 The Anti-Queens (2019)

The Anti-Queens self-titled album was released on September 13, 2019, release and is the bands first release with Stomp Records. The album was recorded at Drive Studios in Toronto, Canada in January 2019. Produced, mixed and mastered by Steve Rizun. The first single was "Worse Than Death".

References

Musical groups from Toronto
2012 establishments in Ontario
Musical groups established in 2012
Canadian punk rock groups